Henry J. Menninger (1838 – 8 September 1889) was a German-American physician, pharmacist, politician, newspaper editor, and merchant. During the American Civil War, 
he served in the United States Army as a surgeon. He was the North Carolina Secretary of State from 1868 to 1873 and was a city official and prominent pharmacist in Brooklyn, New York in the 1880s.

Early life and education 
Henry J. Menninger was born in 1838 near Metz to Dr. John Menninger, one of the German Forty-Eighters. John Menninger was a Radical member of the 1849 Frankfurt Parliament.  The Menningers fled Germany along with Franz Sigel after the failure of that political body, emigrating to New York.  Henry Menninger attended the public school system in New York and paid his way through medical school at New York University by first working in and then opening a drug store in New York. He graduated medical school in 1861 in time to serve in the American Civil War.

American Civil War 
Shortly after receiving his medical degree, Menninger enlisted in the United States Army as a private to fight in the American Civil War. Upon his unit's arrival in Washington D.C., he was promoted to the rank of first lieutenant. In that capacity he led a company during the First Battle of Bull Run. He was later injured at Roach's Mill. He then transferred to the medical corps and served with the Second North Carolina Union Volunteers regiment, and later as a post surgeon at New Bern, NC after being injured. He served through early 1865, when his commission ended.  He chose to stay in occupied New Bern, and opened a drug store in that town, even after the war.

Post-bellum career 

During and after Reconstruction, Menninger was active in the Republican Party, co-founding the New Bern Republican newspaper in 1867. During 1865, he served as the chief surgeon for the Freedmen's Bureau of North Carolina in New Bern, and from 1865 to 1868 he was surgeon for the United States Marine Hospital at New Bern. He was elected to New Bern's town council in 1866 and served until its members were removed by federal officials in May 1867.

In 1868, he moved to Raleigh, North Carolina and was elected Secretary of State of North Carolina, serving until 1873. He focused much of his attention on immigration to North Carolina during his administration, as well as agriculture. He declined to seek reelection. After his term ended, he operated a drug store in Raleigh until leaving the state.  In 1874, he moved to the Fourth Ward of Brooklyn, NY, where he continued to operate a drug store as he had in New Bern. In 1881, he was elected a Republican alderman, and elected coroner in 1883 serving until 1886 when he was defeated by a Democratic opponent.  He was an active member of Mallory Post of the Grand Army of the Republic, a vice-president of the New York College of Pharmacy, and a director of the Germania Savings Bank. He was an active member of the American Pharmaceutical Association for several decades, and served as its first vice president.

See also 
 Franz Sigel
 Forty-Eighters
 List of North Carolina Union Civil War units

References

Works cited 
 
 

1838 births
1889 deaths
New York University Grossman School of Medicine alumni
Secretaries of State of North Carolina
North Carolina Republicans
Pharmacists from North Carolina
Pharmacists from New York City
Union Army surgeons
Coroners of New York City
German-American Forty-Eighters